João Marques da Costa is a Portuguese politician from the Socialist Party. He was made Minister of Education in the XXIII Constitutional Government of Portugal in March 2022.

References 

Living people
21st-century Portuguese politicians
Socialist Party (Portugal) politicians
Government ministers of Portugal
Education ministers of Portugal
1972 births